Condylorrhiza zyphalis is a species of moth of the family Crambidae.  It is found in Madagascar and La Réunion.

Foodplants
The larvae feed on the Salicaceae species Homalium paniculatum.

References

Moths described in 1958
Spilomelinae
Moths of Madagascar
Moths of Africa